Fernanda Miranda Paes Leme de Abreu (born 4 June 1983) is a Brazilian actress.

Biography 

Daughter of the narrator and sports commentator Álvaro José, Paes Leme began her career as a child with interests in advertising campaigns. However, it would be revealed only in the show Sandy & Junior, Rede Globo, where she had her first professional acting job. She played a spoiled teenager, a character she played for four years.

Concluding this series, Paes Leme acted in Sítio do Picapau Amarelo, the telenovela Agora É que São Elas, and the miniseries Um Só Coração, all airing on the same station.

In 2009, Paes Leme participated in the novel Paraíso. Soon after, she landed the role of Dona Flor in the theatrical spectacle Dona Flor e Seus Dois Maridos, replacing Carol Castro.

In 2011, Paes Leme participated in the telenovela Insensato Coração.

Filmography

Television

Film

References

External links 

1983 births
Living people
Actresses from São Paulo
Brazilian telenovela actresses
Brazilian film actresses
Brazilian stage actresses
Brazilian child actresses
Brazilian television presenters
Brazilian women television presenters